meso-Stilbene dibromide is an organic compound with a  formula of (C6H5CH(Br))2.It is one of three isomeric stilbene dibromides, the others being the pair of enantiomers. All are white solids.

Synthesis and reactions
meso-Stilbene dibromide can be prepared by treatment of (E)-stilbene with bromine.

Reaction of stilbene dibromide with base gives diphenylacetylene.

References 

Organobromides